Enrekang may refer to:
 Enrekang language, an Austronesian language spoken on Sulawesi, Indonesia
 Enrekang Regency,  a regency of South Sulawesi Province of Indonesia